The 1997 Edward R. Murrow Awards were presented by the Radio-Television News Directors Association (RTNDA), now renamed the Radio Television Digital News Association (RTDNA) in recognition of what the association terms "outstanding achievements in electronic journalism."  National winners were selected from a pool of regional award winners.  Below are the 1997 national and regional award winners, which recognizes coverage that aired during the previous 1996 calendar year.

Categories that are not listed either had no entrants or the entries received were not deemed worthy of the award.  For regional awards, it is worth noting the states included in each region have changed through the years.  The lists below indicate which states are included in each region for the 1997 awards. The category currently called Breaking News was called "Spot News Coverage" in 1997, so the lists below have been edited to read Breaking/Spot News to avoid any confusion.

The information on this page was retrieved using the Archive.org Internet Wayback Machine to access the now defunct website for RTNDA, a domain that was abandoned when the organization was renamed RTDNA.

1997 National Edward R. Murrow Award Winners

Local Radio Small Market Division 

 Overall Excellence:  WHO-AM, Des Moines, IA
Newscast:  WIVK-AM, Knoxville, TN
 Breaking/Spot News Coverage:  KFGO-AM, Fargo, ND
 Continuing Coverage:  WSYR-AM, Syracuse, NY
Investigative Reporting:  WIVK-AM, Knoxville, TN
Sports Reporting:  WJDX/WMSI-FM, Jackson, MS
 News Series:  WHAS-AM, Louisville, KY
 News Documentary:  WUAL-FM, Tuscaloosa, AL

Local Radio Large Market Division 

 Overall Excellence:  WBAL-AM, Baltimore
 Newscast:  WBZ-AM, Boston
 Breaking/Spot News Coverage:  WGST-AM, Atlanta
 Continuing Coverage:  WFLS-AM, Fredericksburg, VA
 Investigative Reporting:  WJR-AM, Detroit
 Feature Reporting:  WBAP-AM, Arlington, TX
 Sports Reporting:  WBAL-AM, Baltimore
 News Series:  WLW-AM, Cincinnati
 News Documentary:  WMNF-FM, Tampa, FL
 Use of Sound:  KCBS-AM, San Francisco

Local Television Small Market Division 

 Overall Excellence:  WJXT-TV, Jacksonville, FL
 Newscast:  WOKR-TV, Rochester, NY
 Breaking/Spot News Coverage:  KHQ-TV, Spokane, WA
 Continuing Coverage:  KREM-TV, Spokane, WA
 Investigative Reporting:  WWMT-TV, Kalamazoo, MI
 Feature Reporting:  KSL-TV, Salt Lake City, UT
 Sports Reporting:  WBRC-TV, Birmingham, AL
 News Series:  KWTV, Oklahoma City, OK
 News Documentary:  KREM-TV, Spokane, WA
 Use of Video:  WAVE-TV, Louisville, KY

Local Television Large Market Division 

 Overall Excellence:  KARE-TV, Minneapolis
 Newscast:  WCVB-TV, Needham, MA
 Breaking/Spot News Coverage:  WEWS-TV, Cleveland
 Continuing Coverage:  KATU-TV, Portland, OR
 Investigative Reporting:  WAGA-TV, Atlanta
 Feature Reporting:  WFAA-TV, Dallas
 Sports Reporting:  WITI-TV, Milwaukee
 News Series:  WXYZ-TV, Southfield, MI
 News Documentary:  WJLA-TV, Washington
 Use of Video:  KTVT-TV, Fort Worth, TX

Network Radio Division 

 Overall Excellence:  ABC News Radio, New York
 Newscast:  ABC News Radio, New York
 Breaking/Spot News Coverage:  North Carolina News Network, Raleigh, NC
 Continuing Coverage:  ABC News Radio, New York
 Feature Reporting:  ABC News Radio, New York
 News Series:  Wisconsin Public Radio, Madison, WI

Network Television Division 

 Newscast:  Univision Network News, Miami
 Breaking/Spot News Coverage:  Dateline NBC, New York
 Continuing Coverage:  Nightline, ABC News, New York
 Investigative Reporting:  Dateline NBC, New York
 Feature Reporting:  Dateline NBC, New York
 Sports Reporting:  Dateline NBC, New York
 News Series:  Dateline NBC, New York
 News Documentary:  Turning Point, ABC News, New York

1997 Regional Edward R. Murrow Award Winners

Region 1: Alaska, Colorado, Idaho, Montana, New Mexico, Oregon, Utah, Washington, Wyoming

Region 1: Radio Small Market 

 Newscast:                    KSL-AM, Salt Lake City  
 Breaking/Spot News Coverage:          KFQD-AM, Anchorage, AK 
 Continuing Coverage:         KUNM-FM, Albuquerque, NM  
 Feature Reporting:           KTOO-FM, Juneau, AK  
 News Series:                 KSL-AM, Salt Lake City

Region 1: Radio Large Market 

 Overall Excellence:          KOMO-AM, Seattle  
 Newscast:                    KOMO-AM, Seattle  
 Continuing Coverage:         KEX-AM, Portland, OR   
 Feature Reporting:           KGMI-AM, Bellingham, WA  
 News Series:                 KEX-AM, Portland, OR  
 Sports Reporting:            KOA-AM, Denver  
 Use of Sound:                KPLU-FM, Tacoma, WA

Region 1: Television Small Market 

 Overall Excellence:          KREM-TV, Spokane, WA
 Newscast:                    KSL-TV, Salt Lake City
 Breaking/Spot News Coverage:         KHQ-TV, Spokane, WA   
 Continuing Coverage:         KREM-TV, Spokane, WA  
 Feature Reporting:           KSL-TV, Salt Lake City  
 Investigative Reporting:     KOAT-TV, Albuquerque, NM  
 News Documentary:            KREM-TV, Spokane, WA  
 News Series:                 KREM-TV, Spokane, WA  
 Sports Reporting:            KXLY-TV, Spokane, WA  
 Use of Video:                KSTU-TV, Salt Lake City

Region 1: Television Large Market 

 Overall Excellence:          KUSA-TV, Denver  
 Newscast:                    KCNC-TV, Denver    
 Breaking/Spot News Coverage:  KOIN-TV, Portland, OR  
 Continuing Coverage:         KATU-TV, Portland, OR   
 Feature Reporting:           KUSA-TV, Denver   
 Investigative Reporting:     KSTW-TV, Tacoma, WA   
 News Documentary:            KSTW-TV, Tacoma, WA   
 News Series:                 KGW-TV, Portland, OR    
 Use of Video:                KCNC-TV, Denver

Region 2:  Arizona, California, Hawaii, Nevada

Region 2: Radio Small Market 

 No Winners

Region 2: Radio Large Market 

 Overall Excellence:          KCBS-AM, San Francisco  
 Newscast:                    KCBS-AM, San Francisco 
 Breaking/Spot News Coverage:          KNX-AM, Los Angeles  
 Continuing Coverage:         KNX-AM, Los Angeles  
 Feature Reporting:           KNX-AM, Los Angeles  
 News Documentary:            KNX-AM, Los Angeles  
 News Series:                 KNX-AM, Los Angeles  
 Sports Reporting:            KNX-AM, Los Angeles  
 Use of Sound:                KCBS-AM, San Francisco

Region 2: Television Small Market 

 Newscast:                    KTNV-TV, Las Vegas 
 Continuing Coverage:         KVBC-TV, Las Vegas 
 Feature Reporting:           KLAS-TV, Las Vegas 
 News Documentary:            KLVX-TV, Las Vegas 
 Sports Reporting:            KGET-TV, Bakersfield, CA

Region 2: Television Large Market 

 Overall Excellence:          KCAL-TV, Hollywood 
 Newscast:                    KCOP-TV, Los Angeles
 Breaking/Spot News Coverage:          KPNX-TV, Phoenix 
 Continuing Coverage:         KCBS-TV, Los Angeles 
 Feature Reporting:           KTLA-TV, Los Angeles 
 Investigative Reporting:     KNXV-TV, Phoenix 
 News Series:                 KMEX-TV, Los Angeles 
 News Documentary:            KCAL-TV, Hollywood 
 Sports Reporting:            KPNX-TV, Phoenix

Region 3:  Iowa, Kansas, Minnesota, Missouri, Nebraska, North Dakota, South Dakota, Wisconsin

Region 3: Radio Small Market 

 Overall Excellence:          WHO-AM, Des Moines, IA  
 Newscast:                    WOC-AM, Davenport, IA 
 Breaking/Spot News Coverage:          KFGO-AM, Fargo, ND 
 Continuing Coverage:         WHO-AM, Des Moines, IA  
 Feature Reporting:           KIOA-AM, Des Moines, IA  
 News Documentary:            KUWS-FM, Superior, WI  
 News Series:                 KFGO-AM, Fargo, ND

Region 3: Radio Large  Market 

 Overall Excellence:          WTMJ-AM, Milwaukee  
 Breaking/Spot News Coverage:          WTMJ-AM, Milwaukee  
 Continuing Coverage:         WTMJ-AM, Milwaukee  
 Feature Reporting:           WTMJ-AM, Milwaukee  
 Investigative Reporting:     KWMU-FM, St. Louis  
 News Series:                 WCCO-AM, Minneapolis  
 Use of Sound:                WTMJ-AM, Milwaukee

Region 3: Television Small Market 

 Overall Excellence:          WHO-TV, Des Moines, IA 
 Breaking/Spot News Coverage:          KAKE-TV, Wichita, KS 
 Feature Reporting:           KAKE-TV, Wichita, KS  
 Investigative Reporting:     WOWT-TV, Omaha, NE  
 News Documentary:            WDAY-TV, Fargo, ND  
 News Series:                 KAKE-TV, Wichita, KS

Region 3: Television Large Market 

 Overall Excellence:          KARE-TV, Minneapolis  
 Newscast:                    KARE-TV, Minneapolis 
 Breaking/Spot News Coverage:          KARE-TV, Minneapolis   
 Continuing Coverage:         WTMJ-TV, Milwaukee  
 Feature Reporting:           KARE-TV, Minneapolis  
 News Series:                 KARE-TV, Minneapolis  
 Sports Reporting:            WITI-TV, Milwaukee  
 Use of Video:                KARE-TV, Minneapolis

Region 4: Alabama, Arkansas, Louisiana, Mississippi, Oklahoma, Texas

Region 4: Radio Small Market 

 Overall Excellence:          KVOO-AM, Tulsa, OK  
 Newscast:                    WOAI-AM, San Antonio  
 Breaking/Spot News Coverage:          KVOO-AM, Tulsa, OK  
 Continuing Coverage:         KVOO-AM, Tulsa, OK  
 Feature Reporting:           WOAI-AM, San Antonio  
 News Documentary:            WUAL-FM, Tuscaloosa, AL  
 News Series:                 WUAL-FM, Tuscaloosa, AL  
 Sports Reporting:            WJDX-FM, Jackson, MS  
 Use of Sound:                KVOO-AM, Tulsa, OK

Region 4: Radio Large Market 

 Overall Excellence:          KTRH-AM, Houston 
 Newscast:                    KTRH-AM, Houston
 Breaking/Spot News Coverage:          KTRH-AM, Houston  
 Continuing Coverage:         KETR-FM, Commerce, TX  
 Continuing Coverage:         KKDA-AM, Grand Prairie, TX  
 Feature Reporting:           WBAP-AM, Arlington, TX  
 Use of Sound:                KTRH-AM, Houston

Region 4: Television Small Market 

 Overall Excellence:          KOTV, Tulsa, OK  
 Newscast:                    KOTV, Tulsa, OK  
 Breaking/Spot News Coverage:          WBRC-TV, Birmingham, AL  
 Continuing Coverage:         WSFA-TV, Montgomery, AL  
 Feature Reporting:           WDSU-TV, New Orleans  
 Investigative Reporting:    WALA-TV, Mobile, AL  
 Investigative Reporting:     WBRC-TV, Birmingham, AL  
 Investigative Reporting:     WDSU-TV, New Orleans  
 News Documentary:            KFOR-TV, Oklahoma City  
 News Series:                 KWTV-TV, Oklahoma City  
 Sports Reporting:            WBRC-TV, Birmingham, AL  
 Use of Video:                WWL-TV, New Orleans

Region 4: Television Large Market 

 Newscast:                    WFAA-TV, Dallas  
 Breaking/Spot News Coverage:          KTRK-TV, Houston 
 Continuing Coverage:         KRIV-TV, Houston  
 Feature Reporting:          WFAA-TV, Dallas  
 Investigative Reporting:     KXAS-TV, Fort Worth, TX  
 News Series:                  WFAA-TV, Dallas  
 Use of Video:                KTVT-TV, Fort Worth, TX

Region 5: Illinois, Indiana, Michigan, Ohio, West Virginia

Region 5: Radio Small Market 

 Newscast:                    WMBD-AM, Peoria, IL  
 Breaking/Spot News Coverage:          WSOY-AM, Decatur, IL 
 Continuing Coverage:         WJBC-AM, Bloomington, IL  
 Feature Reporting:           WSIU-FM, Carbondale, IL  
 News Documentary:            WSGW-AM, Saginaw, MI  
 News Series:                 WSIU-FM, Carbondale, IL   
 Use of Sound:                WSGW-AM, Saginaw, MI

Region 5: Radio Large Market 

 Overall Excellence:          WBBM-AM, Chicago  
 Newscast:                    WIBC-AM, Indianapolis  
 Breaking/Spot News Coverage:          WBBM-AM, Chicago  
 Continuing Coverage:         WBBM-AM, Chicago  
 Feature Reporting:           WBBM-AM, Chicago  
 Investigative Reporting:     WJR-AM, Detroit  
 News Documentary:            WHBC-AM/FM, Canton, OH  
 News Series:                 WLW-AM, Cincinnati  
 Sports Reporting:            WNDE-AM, Indianapolis  
 Use of Sound:                WBEZ-FM, Chicago

Region 5: Television Small Market 

 Overall Excellence:          WHIO-TV, Dayton, OH  
 Newscast:                    WNDU-TV, South Bend, IN 
 Breaking/Spot News Coverage:          WTOV-TV, Steubenville, OH  
 Continuing Coverage:         WHIO-TV, Dayton, OH  
 Feature Reporting:           WQAD-TV, Moline, IL  
 Investigative Reporting:     WWMT-TV, Kalamazoo, MI  
 News Documentary:            WTOL-TV, Toledo, OH  
 News Series:                 WICS-TV, Springfield, IL  
 Sports Reporting:            WICD-TV, Champaign, IL  
 Use of Video:                WWMT-TV, Kalamazoo, MI

Region 5: Television Large Market 

 Overall Excellence:          WBNS-TV, Columbus, OH  
 Newscast:                    WKRC-TV, Cincinnati  
 Breaking/Spot News Coverage:          WEWS-TV, Cleveland  
 Continuing Coverage:         WXIN-TV, Indianapolis 
 Feature Reporting:           WTHR-TV, Indianapolis  
 Investigative Reporting:     WMAQ-TV, Chicago  
 News Series:                 WXYZ-TV, Southfield, MI  
 Sports Reporting:            WTHR-TV,  Indianapolis  
 Use of Video:                WOIO-TV, Cleveland

Region 6: Florida, Georgia, Kentucky, North Carolina, South Carolina, Tennessee

Region 6: Radio Small Market 

 Overall Excellence:          WIVK-AM, Knoxville, TN  
 Newscast:                    WIVK-AM, Knoxville, TN  
 Breaking/Spot News Coverage:          WIVK-AM, Knoxville, TN 
 Continuing Coverage:         WHAS-AM, Louisville, KY  
 Feature Reporting:           WHAS-AM, Louisville, KY  
 Investigative Reporting:     WIVK-AM, Knoxville, TN  
 News Series:                 WHAS-AM, Louisville, KY  
 Sports Reporting:            WHAS-AM, Louisville, KY

Region 6: Radio Large Market 

 Overall Excellence:          WSB-AM, Atlanta  
 Newscast:                    WSTR-FM, Atlanta 
 Breaking/Spot News Coverage:          WGST-AM, Atlanta  
 Continuing Coverage:         WGST-AM, Atlanta  
 News Documentary:            WMNF-FM, Tampa, FL  
 Sports Reporting:            WSB-AM, Atlanta

Region 6: Television Small Market 

 Overall Excellence:          WJXT-TV, Jacksonville, FL  
 Newscast:                    WPBF-TV, Palm Beach Gardens, FL  
 Breaking/Spot News Coverage:          WIS-TV, Columbia, SC  
 Continuing Coverage:         WGHP-TV, High Point, NC  
 Continuing Coverage:         WHAS-TV, Louisville, KY  
 Feature Reporting:           WHAS-TV, Louisville, KY  
 Investigative Reporting:    WLKY-TV, Louisville, KY  
 News Documentary:            WHAS-TV, Louisville, KY  
 News Series:                 WTLV-TV, Jackonsville, FL  
 Sports Reporting:            WLKY-TV, Louisville, KY  
 Use of Video:                WAVE-TV, Louisville, KY

Region 6: Television Large Market 

 Overall Excellence:          WKRN-TV, Nashville, TN  
 Newscast:                    WKRN-TV, Nashville, TN  
 Breaking/Spot News Coverage:          WFLA-TV, Tampa, FL  
 Continuing Coverage:         WTVD-TV, Durham, NC  
 Feature Reporting:           WRAL-TV, Raleigh, NC  
 Investigative Reporting:     WAGA-TV, Atlanta  
 News Documentary:            WRAL-TV, Raleigh, NC  
 News Series:                 WTVJ-TV, Miami  
 Use of Video:                WSMV-TV, Nashville, TN

Region 7:  New Jersey, New York, Pennsylvania

Region 7: Radio Small Market 

 Newscast:                    WSYR-AM, Syracuse, NY  
 Continuing Coverage:         WSYR-AM, Syracuse, NY  
 News Series:                 WHAM, Rochester, NY

Region 7: Radio Large Market 

 Newscast:                    KDKA-AM, Pittsburgh  
 Breaking/Spot News Coverage:          KYW-AM, Philadelphia  
 Continuing Coverage:         WCBS-AM, New York  
 Feature Reporting:           WHYY-FM, Philadelphia  
 Investigative Reporting:     WCBS-AM, New York  
 News Series:                 WGLS-FM, Glassboro, NJ

Region 7: Television Small Market 

 Overall Excellence:         WOKR-TV, Rochester, NY  
 Newscast:                    WOKR-TV, Rochester, NY  
 Breaking/Spot News Coverage:          WOKR-TV, Rochester, NY  
 Investigative Reporting:     WKBW-TV, Buffalo, NY  
 News Documentary:            WXXI-TV, Rochester, NY  
 News Series:                 WTVH-TV, Syracuse, NY

Region 7: Television Large Market 

 Newscast:                     WTAE-TV, Pittsburgh  
 Breaking/Spot News Coverage:          WTAE-TV, Pittsburgh  
 Feature Reporting:            WPIX-TV, New York  
 Investigative Reporting:      KDKA-TV, Pittsburgh  
 Sports Reporting:            New York 1 News, New York  
 Sports Reporting:            WTXF-TV, Philadelphia  
 Use of Video:                WPIX-TV, New York

Region 8: Delaware, District of Columbia, Maryland, Virginia

Region 8: Radio Small Market 

 Continuing Coverage:         WVIR-TV, Charlottesville, VA  
 Feature Reporting:           WCVE-TV, Richmond, VA  
 Investigative Reporting:     WAVY-TV, Portsmouth, VA  
 News Documentary:            WCVE-TV, Richmond, VA  
 News Series:                 WVEC-TV, Norfolk, VA  
 Newscast:                    WVIR-TV, Charlottesville, VA  
 Overall Excellence:          WBOC-TV, Salisbury, MD  
 Sports Reporting:            WBOC-TV, Salisbury, MD  
 Continuing Coverage:         WJMA- AM/FM, Orange, VA  
 Feature Reporting:           WJMA- AM/FM, Orange, VA  
 Newscast:                    WINA-AM, Charlottesville, VA  
 Overall Excellence:          WVTF-FM, Roanoke, VA  
 Breaking/Spot News Coverage:          WVTF-FM, Roanoke, VA  
 Use of Sound:                WJMA- AM/FM, Orange, VA

Region 8: Radio Large Market 

 Overall Excellence:          WBAL-AM, Baltimore  
 Newscast:                    WBAL-AM, Baltimore  
 Breaking/Spot News Coverage:          WBAL-AM, Baltimore  
 Continuing Coverage:         WFLS-AM, Fredericksburg, VA  
 Feature Reporting:           WMAL-AM, Washington  
 Investigating Reporting:     WBAL-AM, Baltimore  
 News Documentary:            WBAL-AM, Baltimore  
 News Series:                 WBAL-AM, Baltimore  
 Sports Reporting:            WBAL-AM, Baltimore  
 Use of Sound:                WBAL-AM, Baltimore

Region 8: Television Small Market 

 Overall Excellence:          WBOC-TV, Salisbury, MD  
 Newscast:                    WVIR-TV, Charlottesville, VA  
 Continuing Coverage:         WVIR-TV, Charlottesville, VA  
 Feature Reporting:           WCVE-TV, Richmond, VA  
 Investigative Reporting:     WAVY-TV, Portsmouth, VA  
 News Documentary:            WCVE-TV, Richmond, VA  
 News Series:                 WVEC-TV, Norfolk, VA  
 Sports Reporting:            WBOC-TV, Salisbury, MD

Region 8: Television Large Market 

 Overall Excellence:          WJLA-TV, Washington  
 Newscast:                    WRC-TV, Washington  
 Breaking/Spot News Coverage:          WBFF-TV, Baltimore  
 Continuing Coverage:         WJLA-TV, Washington  
 Feature Reporting:           WRC-TV, Washington  
 Investigative Reporting:     WJLA-TV, Washington  
 News Documentary:            WJLA-TV, Washington  
 News Series:                 WRC-TV, Washington  
 Use of Video:                WBFF-TV, Baltimore

Region 9: Connecticut, Massachusetts, Maine, New Hampshire, Rhode Island, Vermont

Region 9: Radio Small Market 

 Overall Excellence:          WCFR-AM, Springfield, VT  
 Continuing Coverage:         WTSL-AM, Lebanon, NH  
 News Series:                 WCFR-AM, Springfield, VT  
 Use of Sound:                WPRO-AM, East Providence, RI

Region 9: Radio Large Market 

 Overall Excellence:          WBZ-AM, Boston  
 Newscast:                    WBZ-AM, Boston  
 Breaking/Spot News Coverage:          WATD-FM, Marshfield, MA  
 Continuing Coverage:         WBZ-AM, Boston

Region 9: Television Small Market 

 Overall Excellence:          WJAR-TV, Cranston, RI  
 Newscast:                    WJAR-TV, Cranston, RI  
 Breaking/Spot News Coverage:          WJAR-TV, Cranston, RI  
 Continuing Coverage:         WLNE-TV, Providence, RI  
 Feature Reporting:           WLBZ-TV, Bangor, ME  
 Investigating Report:        WJAR-TV, Cranston, RI  
 News Documentary:            WJAR-TV, Cranston, RI  
 News Series:                 WGGB-TV, Springfield, MA  
 Use of Video:                WJAR-TV, Cranston, RI

Region 9: Television Large Market 

 Overall Excellence:          WHDH-TV, Boston  
 Newscast:                    WCVB-TV, Needham, MA  
 Continuing Coverage:         WCVB-TV, Needham, MA  
 Feature Reporting:           New England Cable News, Newton, MA  
 Investigative Reporting:     WCVB-TV, Needham, MA  
 News Series:                 WHDH-TV, Boston  
 Sports Reporting:            New England Cable News, Newton, MA  
 Use of Video:                WCVB-TV, Needham, MA

International

International: Radio Small Market 

 No Winners

International: Radio Large Market 

 No Winners

International: Television Small Market 

 No Winners

International: Television Large Market 

 Newscast:                   Television Broadcasts Limited, Kowloon, Hong Kong  
 Breaking/Spot News Coverage: Television Broadcasts Limited, Kowloon, Hong Kong  
 Investigative Reporting:    Television Broadcasts Limited, Kowloon, Hong Kong  
 News Series:                U.TV, Vancouver, Canada  
 Use of Video:                U.TV, Vancouver, Canada

See also
Edward R. Murrow

References

External links
Radio Television Digital News Association
RTDNA Edward R. Murrow Awards

American journalism awards
1997 awards in the United States
1997 literary awards
1997 in American television
Edward R. Murrow Awards